Fine Gold (formerly, Finegold and Gold) (Mono: moohnih ) is an unincorporated community in Madera County, California.

A post office operated at Fine Gold from 1881 to 1882. When the town of Gold was established in 1894, the townsfolk moved there.

References

Unincorporated communities in California
Unincorporated communities in Madera County, California